Quilmes FC from Sabah enters a team in Malaysian futsal competitions in 2013. The team moved their home ground to Kuala Lumpur at Commercial Center Futsal Court, Sentul due to travelling factor because all the League fixtures are held at KSL Sport Puchong Utama Futsal Centre & KSL Sports Centre Sri Gombak in Selangor.

History
Quilmes is a football club which is active in Sabah since 1999. The club is more focused in futsal and football. Since actively involved in the game of futsal, Quilmes has won 15 titles throughout the state of Sabah.

The team has also represented Sabah in various tournaments in Kuala Lumpur such as Celcom Futsal Tournament 2010 and Red Bull Futsal Carnival 2011.

Quilmes is divided into 4 futsal teams:
Quilmes, Quilmes 2000, Quilmes Junior & Quilmes KL.

Quilmes players is the most representatives for the state team Sabah FA in the National Futsal League 2011/2012 with a total of 8 players.

In 2012, Quilmes FC was registered with the Sports Commissioner of Malaysia and also became affiliate member of Sabah Football Association (SAFA) and the Federal Territories Sports Council (MSWP).

Quilmes KL was established and competed in 2012 DBKL Youth Futsal League. Quilmes clinched the title after winning the final match 4-2 against Ger's FT in December 2012.

Quilmes FC entered the qualifying play-off round of 2013/2014 National Futsal League for the first time and won their final play-off round match against archrival Sabah SAFA KK 6 - 2, and thus earned promotion to the 2013/2014 National Futsal League season.

As an affiliated member of the Federal Territories Sports Council (MSWP), Quilmes represented the Federal Territories in the 2013 Sukma Games which was hosted by the Federal Territories in July 2013. The team won the silver medal after they were defeated by Penang 1-5 in the final match.

Honours

Club officials

Current staff

Current squad 2013/2014

Transfers

Transfers (In)

Transfers (Out)

2013/2014 season

Season statistics

Goalscorers

Own goals

Hat-tricks

Fastest goal

Under-21 squad (SUKMA 2013)

SUKMA 2013 results

Sponsorship

Notable players

Local
  Firdaus Ambiah
  Indrastono Sulaiman
  Andrew Addan Markus
  Jasmit Ahmad
  Rashyad Allen R. Hussain
  Bass Ama Koten (Dani)
  Rizal Abdul Hamid
  Herman Abdul Latif Safee

Foreigner
  Asming Talek
  Sorasak Phonjungreed
  Mohamad Imran Idris (Ilo)
  Usamah
|}

Affiliated clubs

Malaysia
  Federal Territory SUKMA Futsal
  KK SEL
  Kartallar SC

Foreign
  Brilyan Sport FC
  Lampang United
  Chonburi Bluewave
|}

See also
 Malaysia National Futsal League
 Malaysia men's national futsal team
 Malaysia women's national futsal team

External links
 Arena Futsal Malaysia
 Quilmes Futsal

Futsal clubs in Malaysia
Futsal clubs established in 2012
2012 establishments in Malaysia